Anthurium sect. Porphyrochitonium is a section within the genus Anthurium, which comprises about 250 species. Plants of this section are typified by Anthurium scherzerianum. The most definitive feature of the section is a large, bright red spathe.  Other than this distinction, it shares nearly every other characteristic with section Urospadix. Anthuriums that belong to Porphyrochitonium are generally delicate in appearance, bearing slender stems with short internodes and elongated, non-cordate leaf blades which are glandular-punctate on at least one surface. There are one or more well-defined collective veins, and the berries generally have three seeds.

Distribution of the section is from Costa Rica to Peru, with the highest concentration of species in Colombia.

References
https://web.archive.org/web/20070618153147/http://www.aroid.org/genera/Anthurium/anthsections07.html

Porphyrochitonium
Plant sections